Alistair John Hargreaves (born 29 April 1986 in Durban, South Africa) is a former rugby union player that played as a lock. He attended the Durban High School, where he was captain of rugby and headboy in 2004. During his time at the school Hargreaves represented the first XV from 2002 to 2004 and was regarded as one of the best talents in youth rugby. His performances led to selection for the SA schools side which he captained in 2004.

Since then he has gone on to represent the SA under 19 and u/21 sides, playing at both the Under 19 Rugby World Championship in 2004 and 2005 (of which he was captain). Impressive performances in these tournaments led to more opportunities with the Sharks and over the past few years he has established himself as a regular starter. To date he has picked up four caps for the national side along while also playing in non-capped games against Leicester Tigers and Saracens.

On 12 April 2012 Hargreaves signed a two-year deal with Saracens RFC. He was to link up alongside former Springboks including John Smit, Neil de Kock and Schalk Brits. He captained Saracens to victory in the 2015 Premiership final against Bath.

He announced his retirement from rugby in October 2016 after suffering multiple concussions. He then started working for Wolfpack lager, with former team-mate Chris Wyles.

References

External links
Sharks profile

Springbok Rugby Hall of Fame
itsrugby.co.uk profile

1986 births
Living people
Expatriate rugby union players in England
Rugby union locks
Rugby union players from Durban
Sharks (Currie Cup) players
Sharks (rugby union) players
South Africa international rugby union players
South African expatriate rugby union players
South African expatriate sportspeople in England
South African people of British descent
South African rugby union players
White South African people